Condeixa-a-Nova, also known as just Condeixa, is a town and a municipality in the district of Coimbra, Portugal. The population in 2011 was 17,078, in an area of 138.67 km². It is located 15 km south of Coimbra, and is part of the Região de Coimbra. The town is known for the ancient Roman settlement of Conímbriga which is located nearby, and includes a museum and the well-preserved ruins.

Economy
The municipality of Condeixa-a-Nova is traditionally a center for agriculture. The municipality has also a number of industries ranging from ceramics to pharmaceuticals (Medinfar). The ancient Roman settlement of Conímbriga, is an important tourist attraction.

Parishes
Administratively, the municipality is divided into seven civil parishes (freguesias):
 Anobra
 Condeixa-a-Velha e Condeixa-a-Nova
 Ega
 Furadouro
 Sebal e Belide
 Vila Seca e Bem da Fé
 Zambujal

Notable people 

 Antão de Almada (1718 in Condeixa-a-Nova – 1797) the Grand Master of Ceremonies for the Royal House and first Captain-General of the Azores.
 Fernando Namora (1919 in Condeixa-a-Nova – 1989) a Portuguese writer and medical doctor.

References

External links

 Municipality of Condeixa-a-Nova 
 Photos from Condeixa-a-Nova on Flickr

Towns in Portugal
Municipalities of Coimbra District
People from Condeixa-a-Nova